Novoyanbekovo (Yañı Yänbäk) is a rural locality (a village) in Kadyrgulovsky Selsoviet, Davlekanovsky District, Bashkortostan, Russia. The population was 187 as of 2010. There is 1 street.

Geography 
Novoyanbekovo is located 46 km east of Davlekanovo (the district's administrative centre) by road. Kamchalytamak is the nearest rural locality.

References 

Rural localities in Davlekanovsky District